The 2000 U.S. Women's Open was the 55th U.S. Women's Open, held July 20–23 at the Merit Club in Libertyville, Illinois, a suburb north of Chicago and west of Waukegan. Karrie Webb won the first of two consecutive U.S Women's Opens, five strokes ahead of runners-up Cristie Kerr and Meg Mallon. It was the third of Webb's seven major titles.

This was the first time in 19 years that the championship had been held in the Chicago metropolitan area; the Merit Club course opened eight years earlier in 1992. The purse was $2.75 million, an increase of over 57% from the previous year, with a winner's share of $500,000. Webb also picked up an additional $250,000 bonus from the Nabisco Grand Slam Challenge for winning two majors in the same year.

This championship was scheduled concurrently with The Open Championship in Scotland, where Tiger Woods won his fourth straight major title at St. Andrews to secure his historic Tiger Slam.

Course layout

Past champions in the field

Made the cut

Source:

Missed the cut

Source:

Round summaries

First round
Thursday, July 20, 2000

Source:

Second round
Friday, July 21, 2000

Source:

Third round
Saturday, July 22, 2000

Source:

Final round
Sunday, July 23, 2000

Source:

References

External links
U.S. Women's Open - past champions - 2000

U.S. Women's Open
Golf in Illinois
Sports competitions in Illinois
Libertyville, Illinois
Women's sports in Illinois
U.S. Women's Open
U.S. Women's Open
U.S. Women's Open
U.S. Women's Open